Caeau Bronydd-mawr is a Site of Special Scientific Interest in Brecknock, Powys, Wales. It is a fen meadow, notable for its contrasting neutral and acid grassland areas. The site is under private ownership.

References

See also
List of Sites of Special Scientific Interest in Brecknock

Sites of Special Scientific Interest in Brecknock